The Hart Baronetcy, of Kilmoriarty in the County of Armagh, was a title in the Baronetage of the United Kingdom. It was created on 17 July 1893 for Sir Robert Hart, Inspector-General of China's Imperial Maritime Customs Service. The title became extinct on the death of the third Baronet in 1970.

Hart baronets, of Kilmoriarty (1893)
Sir Robert Hart, 1st Baronet (1835–1911)
Sir Edgar Bruce Hart, 2nd Baronet (1873–1963)
Sir Robert Hart, 3rd Baronet (1918–1970)

Arms

References

Extinct baronetcies in the Baronetage of the United Kingdom